After the Waterfall is a 2010 New Zealand drama based on Stephen Blanchard's novel The Paraffin Child. The film, Simone Horrocks' directorial debut, stars Outrageous Fortune's Antony Starr. It was released theatrically in New Zealand on 4 November 2010.

Premise
John Drean (Antony Starr) is a park ranger whose marriage to his wife Ana (Sally Stockwell) begins to suffer when their daughter, Pearl (Georgia Rose), goes missing under his care. Four years later, John is still looking for his little girl and his life seems to be at a standstill, while Ana is in a relationship with John's best friend, and the policeman behind Pearl's disappearance, David (Cohen Holloway). Things begin to change for the better, however, when John's father, George (Peter McCauley), believes he saw Pearl walking past a shop window.

Cast
 Antony Starr as John Drean
 Sally Stockwell as Ana Drean
 Cohen Holloway as David
 Peter McCauley as George
 Georgia Rose as Pearl

Production
In May 2009 it was announced that award-winning director Simone Horrocks would be directing her debut feature-length production and that Outrageous Fortune actor Antony Starr would be portraying the lead role. Horrocks had previously attracted international attention when she was a semi-finalist for the prestigious Sundance Institute/NHK Filmmaker's Award in 2001.

Reception

Critical reception
The film was released to critical acclaim throughout New Zealand with many praising Starr's acting. Darren Bevan of TVNZ stated that the film was great but slightly let down by Cohen Holloway's performance but Starr makes up for the small hiccup.
Francesca Rudkin of The New Zealand Herald gave the film 4/5 stars praising Starr's performance and the plot. She also praises Peter McCauley's performance and the soundtrack saying it adds to the atmosphere immensely. Andrew Hedley of Flicks.co.nz praised Starr's acting but noted the film was at times inconsistent and poorly written. Helen Martin of Onfilm magazine praised Starr's acting alongside the camera shots and music. Christine Powley of the Otago Daily Times criticized the inexperience of the crew but praised how the movie felt Kiwi without resorting to Kiwiana.

Accolades
The film received several nominations in the 2011 Aotearoa Film & Television Awards, including; director Simone Horrocks for "Outstanding Feature Film Debut", "Best Editing in a Feature Film", "Images & Sound Best Sound in a Feature Film" and "Best Lead Actor in a Feature Film" for Antony Starr.

References

External links
 

2010 films
New Zealand drama films
2010s English-language films
Films based on British novels
Films about dysfunctional families
Films about kidnapping
2010 directorial debut films